Arirang geuhu iyagi (아리랑 그 후 이야기 literally A Story of the Day after Arirang aka 아리알 후편, Arirang hu pyeon, aka Arirang 2) is a 1930 Korean film written by and starring Na Woon-gyu. It premiered at Dan Sung Sa Theater in downtown Seoul.

Plot
In this sequel to Arirang (1926), Choi Yeong-jin, the mentally ill lead character of the first film, returns home from prison to find his father and sister deep in debt. The film ends with Young-jin again being sent to prison for murder.

See also
 Korea under Japanese rule
 List of Korean-language films
 Cinema of Korea

References

External links 
 Images from Arirang geuhu iyagi at The Korean Film Archive (KOFA)
 

1930 films
Pre-1948 Korean films
Korean silent films
Korean black-and-white films